Mary Keane may refer to:

 Molly Keane (1904–1996), Irish novelist and playwright
 Mary Beth Keane (born 1977), American writer of Irish parentage